Bangladesh competed at the 2009 Asian Youth Games held in Singapore from June 29 to July 7, 2009. Total 12 athletes form Bangladesh participated in 4 events, 3-on-3 Basketball, Athletics, Shooting and Swimming.

Medalists
Bangladesh did not win any medal in 2009 Asian Youth Games.

Basketball

Boys (Group A)

 Bangladesh did not advance in next stage.

Athletics

Boys

Girls

Shooting

Boys

Girls

Swimming

Boys

References

Nations at the 2009 Asian Youth Games
2009 in Bangladeshi sport
Bangladesh at the Asian Games